Phil Graham (born 16 July 1970) is a Canadian rower. He competed at the 1996 Summer Olympics and the 2000 Summer Olympics.

References

External links
 

1970 births
Living people
Canadian male rowers
Olympic rowers of Canada
Rowers at the 1996 Summer Olympics
Rowers at the 2000 Summer Olympics
Sportspeople from Halifax, Nova Scotia
Pan American Games medalists in rowing
Pan American Games silver medalists for Canada
Pan American Games bronze medalists for Canada
Rowers at the 1995 Pan American Games
Rowers at the 1999 Pan American Games
Medalists at the 1995 Pan American Games
Medalists at the 1999 Pan American Games